The following highways are numbered 907:

Costa Rica
 National Route 907

India
National Highway 907 (India)

United States